Sergey Vasilyevich Marchuk (13 April 1952 – 25 August 2016) was a Russian speed skater.

Biography
In 1977, Marchuk skated 3:56.65 on the 3,000 m on the fast Medeo rink of Alma-Ata, significantly below Ard Schenk's world record time of 4:08.3. Unfortunately for Marchuk, the tournament had not been approved by the International Skating Union (ISU) and so his time was not recognised as a world record. It would be 15 years before anyone, officially or unofficially, skated the 3,000 m faster than Marchuk had. This happened in 1992 when Thomas Bos skated an official world record of 3:56.16 at the indoor arena of Calgary – the Olympic Oval.
Marchuk had his best year in 1978 when he became Soviet Allround Champion, European Allround Champion, and won bronze at the World Allround Championships.

Medals
An overview of medals won by Marchuk at important championships he participated in, listing the years in which he won each. He participated at least once in all the championships that are listed.

Personal records
To put these personal records in perspective, the WR column lists the official world records on the dates that Marchuk skated his personal records.

Note that Marchuk's personal record on the 1,000 m was not recognised as a world record by the ISU because he skated it at a non-approved meet. In addition, Eric Heiden skated even faster (1:14.47) at that same meet. Marchuk's personal record on the 3,000 m was set during that same non-approved meet, so it was not recognised as a world record either. Finally, Marchuk's personal record on the big combination was not a world record either because Jan Egil Storholt skated 163.221 at that same meet.

Marchuk has an Adelskalender score of 162.996 points. He was number one on the Adelskalender for 350 days in 1977 and 1978.

References

 Eng, Trond. All Time International Championships, Complete Results: 1889 - 2002. Askim, Norway: WSSSA-Skøytenytt, 2002.
 Teigen, Magne. Komplette Resultater Internasjonale Mesterskap 1889 - 1989: Menn/Kvinner, Senior/Junior, allround/sprint. Veggli, Norway: WSSSA-Skøytenytt, 1989.

External links
 Sergey Marchuk at SkateResults.com
 Sergey Marchuk. Deutsche Eisschnelllauf Gemeinschaft e.V. (German Skating Association).
 Personal records from Jakub Majerski's Speedskating Database
 Evert Stenlund's Adelskalender pages
 Results of Championships of Russia and the USSR from SpeedSkating.ru
 Historical World Records. International Skating Union.

1952 births
2016 deaths
Russian male speed skaters
Soviet male speed skaters
Olympic speed skaters of the Soviet Union
Speed skaters at the 1976 Winter Olympics
World Allround Speed Skating Championships medalists